Carlos Pages (born 13 November 1978) is an Argentine rower. He competed in the men's quadruple sculls event at the 1996 Summer Olympics.

References

1978 births
Living people
Argentine male rowers
Olympic rowers of Argentina
Rowers at the 1996 Summer Olympics
Place of birth missing (living people)